Myrmarachne uniseriata is a species of spider of the genus Myrmarachne. It is native to India and Sri Lanka. In Sri Lanka, the species was found in the Ethagala range of Kurunegala District. The species can easily identified by the reddish orange-coloured carapace and dorsally flat chelicerae of male.

The species was first described by Narayan in 1915. Separately, Myrmarachne aurantiaca was described by Benjamin in 2015. In 2017, Caleb and Benjamin reduced this name to a synonym of Myrmarachne uniseriata.

References

Salticidae
Spiders described in 1915
Spiders of the Indian subcontinent
Fauna of Sri Lanka